Cowarts  is a town in Houston County, Alabama, United States. The town incorporated in August 1961. It is part of the Dothan, Alabama Metropolitan Statistical Area. At the 2010 census the population was 1,871, up from 1,546 in 2000.

Geography
Cowarts is located in north-central Houston County at  (31.199575, -85.306272). It is bordered to the north and west by the city of Dothan and to the southeast by the town of Avon. A small part of the northern border of Cowarts is with the town of Webb.

U.S. Route 84 passes through the southern part of the town, leading west  to the center of Dothan and southeast  to Bainbridge, Georgia.

Demographics

2000 census
At the 2000 census there were 1,546 people, 603 households, and 469 families in the town. The racial makeup of the town was 84.93% White, 12.35% Black or African American, 0.65% Native American, 0.39% Asian, 0.39% from other races, and 1.29% from two or more races. 0.52% of the population were Hispanic or Latino of any race.
Of the 603 households 32.3% had children under the age of 18 living with them, 58.9% were married couples living together, 15.8% had a female householder with no husband present, and 22.1% were non-families. 18.6% of households were one person and 6.8% were one person aged 65 or older. The average household size was 2.56 and the average family size was 2.90.

The age distribution was 24.7% under the age of 18, 8.8% from 18 to 24, 28.1% from 25 to 44, 27.5% from 45 to 64, and 10.9% 65 or older. The median age was 36 years. For every 100 females, there were 92.3 males. For every 100 females age 18 and over, there were 89.6 males.

The median household income was $36,688 and the median family income  was $41,198. Males had a median income of $28,281 versus $19,464 for females. The per capita income for the town was $17,793. About 10.3% of families and 13.1% of the population were below the poverty line, including 16.7% of those under age 18 and 18.0% of those age 65 or over.

2010 census
At the 2010 census there were 1,871 people, 734 households, and 557 families in the town. The racial makeup of the town was 80.8% White, 14.6% Black or African American, 0.7% Native American, 0.1% Asian, 0.6% from other races, and 3.2% from two or more races. 1.7% of the population were Hispanic or Latino of any race.
Of the 734 households 29.4% had children under the age of 18 living with them, 57.2% were married couples living together, 13.6% had a female householder with no husband present, and 24.1% were non-families. 21.1% of households were one person and 8.2% were one person aged 65 or older. The average household size was 2.55 and the average family size was 2.92.

The age distribution was 24.3% under the age of 18, 6.5% from 18 to 24, 25.9% from 25 to 44, 29.2% from 45 to 64, and 14.2% 65 or older. The median age was 40.1 years. For every 100 females, there were 94.7 males. For every 100 females age 18 and over, there were 97.4 males.

The median household income was $36,014 and the median family income  was $47,625. Males had a median income of $42,016 versus $29,450 for females. The per capita income for the town was $19,808. About 10.4% of families and 14.6% of the population were below the poverty line, including 22.8% of those under age 18 and 17.3% of those age 65 or over.

2020 census

As of the 2020 United States census, there were 1,930 people, 734 households, and 568 families residing in the town.

References 

Towns in Houston County, Alabama
Towns in Alabama
Dothan metropolitan area, Alabama